Bank of Italy building in Downtown Visalia was built in 1923 at 128 East Main Street.  The Bank of Italy building has five stories plus a basement.  R. F. Felchlin, a Fresno construction company, supplied the architectural, engineering, and contracting services.  The ground level was designed to be a bank, and the other space was set aside for offices.  Later it became the Bank of America.  Today the ground floor continues to be a bank, and the upper floors still provide office space.

The building was listed on the National Register of Historic Places in Tulare County, California on April 1, 1982.

References

Bank buildings on the National Register of Historic Places in California
Neoclassical architecture in California
Commercial buildings completed in 1923
Buildings and structures in Visalia, California
Italian-American culture in California
National Register of Historic Places in Tulare County, California